Hasta que la plata nos separe (English: Until Money Do[es] Us Part) is a Colombian telenovela created and written by Fernando Gaitán, starring Victor Hugo Cabrera and Marcela Carvajal. It is produced and broadcast by RCN Televisión from May 22, 2006 to October 11, 2007.

Cast

Main 
 Victor Hugo Cabrera as Rafael Méndez Rengifo
 Marcela Carvajal as Alejandra Maldonado Ricaurte
 Gustavo Ángel as Rubén Valenzuela Sáenz "El Tinterillo"
 Claudia Liliana González as María Victoria "Vicky" Parra "La Pajarita"
 Katherine Porto as Susana Rengifo
 María Helena Doering as Rosaura Suárez de De la Peña
 Lincoln Palomeque as Nelson José Ospina "El Dandy"
 Constanza Duque as Rosario Maldonado
 Martha Isabel Bolaños as Claudia Bermúdez
 Álvaro Rodríguez as Vicente Chávez
 Joavany Álvarez as Carlos Arango "El Papeto"
 Ernesto Benjumea as Edgar Marino
 Mario Ruiz as Germán Ramírez
 Carlos Benjumea as Ismael Dueñas "El Bebé"
 Katherine Vélez as Isabel Duarte "La Generala"
 Ricardo Leguízamo as Efraín Álvarez "El Contacto"
 Carlos Serrato as Ramiro Jiménez
 Óscar Dueñas as ''Juanito Flórez "Trapito"
 Javier Gnecco as Dr. Gabriel Bernal
 Humberto Dorado as Jorge Maldonado
 Santiago Alarcón as Jaime Rincón
 Ana María Arango as Leonor Rengifo de Méndez
 Adriana Silva as Julieta Méndez
 César Mora as Don Gastón Parra
 Gustavo Angarita Jr. as Franklin Parra
 Fernando Solórzano as Giovanni Parra
 Margalida Castro as Azucena
 Pepe Sánchez as Alberto Manrique
 Vicky Hernández as Carmela Muñoz "Doña Bastantona"
 Valerie Domínguez as Marian Sajir
 Rosemary Bohórquez as Ruby
 Germán Escallón as "El poeta"
 Javier Gnecco Jr. as Eduardo De La Peña
 Diego Sarmiento as Spencer
 María Elvira Arango as Esperanza
 Carmenza Gómez as Doña Dolores
 Gustavo Angarita as Frank "Frankestein"
 Patrick Delmas as Michel
 Ricardo Vélez as Guillermo Soler
 Tatiana Rentería as Karen
 Jéssica Sanjuán as Mónica
 Juan Carlos Arango as Ramón
 Andrés Felipe Martínez as Rigoberto Martínez
 Laila Vieira as Carla Domínguez
 Jenny Vargas as Pilar
 Luis Fernando Salas as Tato Yerman
 Carolina Trujillo as Lariza

Recurring 
 Carolina Ramírez as Rosario del Pilar Guerrero
 Mark Tacher as Francisco Lara
 Gregorio Pernía as Manuel "El Coloso" Rodríguez
 Mario Duarte as Vladimir "El Mil Amores" Fernando Molina

See also 
 List of RCN Televisión telenovelas and series

References

External links 
 

2006 telenovelas
2006 Colombian television series debuts
2007 Colombian television series endings
RCN Televisión telenovelas
Colombian telenovelas
Spanish-language telenovelas
Television shows set in Bogotá